The North Sea Mine Barrage, also known as the Northern Barrage, was a large minefield laid easterly from the Orkney Islands to Norway by the United States Navy (assisted by the Royal Navy) during World War I.  The objective was to inhibit the movement of U-boats from bases in Germany to the Atlantic shipping lanes bringing supplies to the British Isles.  Rear Admiral Lewis Clinton-Baker, commanding the Royal Navy minelaying force at the time, described the barrage as the "biggest mine planting stunt in the world's history." Larger fields with greater numbers of mines were laid during World War II.

Concept
The idea of a mine barrage across the North Sea was first proposed in the summer of 1916 by Admiral Reginald Bacon and was agreed at the Allied Naval Conference on 5 September 1917. The Royal Navy—and in particular Admiral Beatty as Commander in Chief of the Grand Fleet—was skeptical about the value of the operation and did not feel it justified the large logistical and manufacturing commitment required. A minefield across the North Sea had been estimated to require 400,000 conventional anchored mines.

The United States was altogether more enthusiastic about the operation, as the loss of trans-Atlantic shipping was a major domestic concern and this plan allowed the United States to play an active part in tackling this, while playing to their industrial strength and with minimal risk of American casualties. Assistant Secretary of the Navy Franklin D. Roosevelt appealed directly to President Woodrow Wilson to overcome opposition to the project from Vice Admiral William Sims, who commanded all United States naval forces in Europe. Project spending of $40 million was shared among 140 manufacturing contractors and over 400 sub-contractors. All mine components other than wire rope, explosives, and detonating circuitry were manufactured by Detroit automobile firms. Eight civilian steamships were converted to minelayers; and another 24 mine-carrying freighters, sailing at a rate of two or three per week, were required to transport manufactured mine components to assembly depots in Scotland.

Objectives
The objective was to prevent U-boats from operating in the North Atlantic and preying on trans-Atlantic shipping. A similar barrage had already been placed across the English Channel, which had resulted in U-boats diverting north around Scotland. The North Sea Mine Barrage was intended to close this alternative route, and it also made it hard for the U-boats to get supplies.

Mark 6 Mines

Each mine was constructed of two steel hemispheres welded together. A Toxyl bursting charge was cast into the lower hemisphere. Toxyl was a mixture of 60% trinitroxylene (TNX) with 40% TNT used because the United States Army controlled United States TNT production and would not release sufficient quantities for the naval mine barrage. For transport, the mine rested atop a box-shaped steel anchor approximately  square. The anchor box had wheels allowing the mine assembly to be moved along a system of rails aboard the minelayer. The mine was connected to its  anchor box by a wire rope mooring cable stored on a reel. The depth of the mine below the water surface was controlled by allowing the steel mooring cable to unwind from its reel as the mine was dropped from the minelayer until a sensor suspended beneath the anchor reached the bottom. The sensor locked the cable reel so the falling anchor would pull the buoyant mine below the surface; and the float extended the antenna above the mine.

Each mine had two hydrostatic safety features intended to render the mine safe if it detached from its mooring cable and floated to the surface. The first was an open switch in the detonation circuit closed by hydrostatic pressure. The second was a spring pushing the detonator away from the explosive charge into the buoyancy chamber unless compressed by hydrostatic pressure. The mines contained a dry cell battery each with an electrical detonating circuit which could be initiated by any one of five parallel fuzes. Four of the fuzes were conventional horns in the buoyant upper hemisphere of the mine. Each horn contained a glass ampoule of electrolyte which would connect an open circuit if an ampoule was broken by bending the soft metal horn. The novel fifth fuze was a copper wire antenna with a float to extend it above the mine. A ship's steel hull touching the copper antenna would form a battery, and seawater acted as an electrolyte completing a circuit with an insulated copper plate on the mine surface to actuate a detonating relay within the mine. The relay armature was initially set to complete the detonating circuit at 25 to 40 millivolts. The Bureau of Ordnance subsequently increased sensitivity to 10 to 25 millivolts, but this was later readjusted on the basis of field experience. Each mine had five separate spring-loaded safety switches in the detonating circuit held open by salt pellets which took about 20 minutes to dissolve in sea water after the mine was dropped overboard from the minelayer. Battery life for the detonating circuit was estimated at greater than two years.

Laying the minefield
The Royal Navy laid mines in areas B and C while the United States Navy mined area A.  The Royal Navy left a  channel open for navigation adjacent to Orkney. Because of neutrality regulations no mines were laid within Norwegian territorial waters. The United States North Sea Mine Force was commanded by Rear Admiral Joseph Strauss aboard the Atlantic Fleet Mine Force flagship . Strauss was an ordnance specialist and had been chief of the Bureau of Ordnance from 1913 to 1916. Mine Squadron One, under the command of Captain Reginald R. Belknap, assembled at Inverness, Scotland in June 1918. Over the following five months, these ships planted 56,571 of the 70,177 mines laid to form the North Sea mine barrage.

The WWI Mine Memorial on Boston Common, Massachusetts, United States

  (old protected cruiser converted in 1911 to carry 170 mines) (flagship)
  (old protected cruiser converted in 1915 carry 180 mines)
  (former Eastern steamship Bunker Hill carried 320 mines on one deck)
 USS Shawmut (former Eastern steamship Massachusetts carried 320 mines on one deck)
  (former Southern Pacific freighter El Siglo carried 830 mines on 3 decks)
  (former Southern Pacific freighter El Dia carried 830 mines on 3 decks)
  (former Southern Pacific freighter El Cid carried 830 mines on 3 decks)
  (former Southern Pacific freighter El Rio carried 830 mines on 3 decks)
  (former Old Dominion steamship Hamilton carried 612 mines on 2 decks)
  (former Old Dominion steamship Jefferson carried 612 mines on 2 decks)

The mine barrage consisted of 18 rows of mines laid in an east–west direction. Since Utsira is slightly north of Orkney, alignment of minefields within the central area A was skewed east-northeasterly from Orkney. Where possible, longitude was determined from a calibrated taut-wire anchored near a landmark and unreeled from a  spool of piano wire aboard one of the cruisers acting as the minelaying formation guide. Latitude was checked from the elevation of the sun when atmospheric conditions permitted. The mine barrage required multiple missions, called "excursions", laying parallel rows of mines partway across the North Sea between Norway and Orkney. As a minelayer exhausted its supply of mines, another minelayer in that column would drop back to the last position to continue the minelaying sequence. The minelayers were preceded by Royal Navy destroyers sweeping for enemy mines and submarines. A covering force of battleships with Royal Navy cruiser squadrons maneuvered nearby to defend the minelaying formation, but no German surface warships attempted engagement. Buoys were dropped temporarily marking the end point of a mining excursion to avoid leaving an unmined gap when the next excursion started. These buoys were subject to potential movement by storms or enemy action.

Three to five percent of the new mines dropped into the North Sea detonated as soon as the salt pellets dissolved; and hydrophones detected premature detonations continuing for a week after minelaying. About one percent of the mines deployed during the first excursion broke free of their mooring cables and washed ashore in Norway within a month. Mines used for the last eleven excursions had springs installed at the mine mooring cable attachment points to buffer wave loading during storms. Premature detonations increased to 14 percent for the fourth minelaying excursion; because some mines had been assembled with the more sensitive antenna fuze relay settings made by the Bureau of Ordnance. The fifth minelaying excursion was halted when 19 percent of the mines detonated prematurely. San Francisco identified relay armature sensitivity as a major cause of premature detonations during a comparative field test minelaying excursion on 12 August. Subsequent investigations revealed copper sulfate deposits caused by antenna corrosion created a weak battery, increasing the probability of relay activation by shock wave accelerations when nearby mines detonated. Premature detonations dropped to four to six percent when sensitivity was adjusted to 30 to 45 millivolts for mines deployed by the last five minelaying excursions.

Results
Supply problems and technical difficulties caused some delays.  More minelaying excursions to complete the barrage were cancelled when the approaching end of hostilities was recognized after the thirteenth minelaying excursion on 26 October 1918. The design of the minefield meant there was a theoretical 66 per cent chance of a surfaced U-boat triggering a mine and a 33 per cent chance for a submerged U-boat. On the basis of the number of effective mines observed while sweeping the barrage, the actual odds were assessed at being closer to 20 per cent for a surfaced U-boat and 10 per cent for a submerged one. As the final mines were laid only a matter of days before the end of the war, it is impossible to assess the success of the plan.  Some contend the minefield was a major cause of the declining morale of the Imperial German Navy through the final months of the war, while others suggest Germany easily swept safe channels through the large, unguarded minefield.

The official statistics on lost German submarines compiled on 1 March 1919 credited the North Sea mine barrage with the certain destruction of four U-boats, presumed destruction of two more and possible destruction of another two.
 19 August 1918  unknown - possibly sunk by the North Sea mine barrage
 9 September 1918  presumed sunk by the North Sea mine barrage area B (confirmed in 2007)
 9 September 1918  sunk by the North Sea mine barrage area B
 25 September 1918  sunk by the North Sea mine barrage area A
 September 1918  presumed sunk by the North Sea mine barrage area B (confirmed in 2006)
 19 September 1918  sunk by the North Sea mine barrage area B
 September 1918  unknown - possibly sunk by the North Sea mine barrage
 18 October 1918  sunk by the North Sea mine barrage area A
Eight more boats were known to have been damaged by the mines and some Admiralty personnel assumed the field might be responsible for five more U-boats which disappeared without explanation.

Cleanup
United States participation in the minesweeping effort was overseen by Rear Admiral Strauss aboard the repair ship Black Hawk, from which he had commanded the minelaying operation.  Tugs  and  towed Admiralty wooden sailing smacks Red Rose and Red Fern out to conduct the first trial sweep in December.  Sweeping was accomplished by suspending a serrated wire between two ships on a parallel course.  While held underwater by planing devices called "kites", the wire would foul the cables suspending the buoyant mines above their anchors.  If the serrated wire parted the mine mooring cable, the mine would bob to the surface to be destroyed by gunfire.  The smacks swept and destroyed six mines before winter weather halted further work at sea.  The winter was spent testing an electrical protective device to reduce the risk of sweeping the antenna mines with steel-hulled ships.  Patapsco and Patuxent tested the protective device by sweeping 39 mines in March. Royal Navy minesweeping efforts involved 421 vessels manned by 600 officers and 15,000 men from 1 April to 30 November 1919.

Twelve Lapwing class minesweepers and 18 submarine chasers were available for the first routine sweep of the United States minesweepers on 29 April 1919.  After the first sweep took two days to clear 221 mines, Strauss requested more ships in the hope of clearing the mine barrage that summer.  Twenty Admiralty trawlers with American crews, 16 more Lapwing class minesweepers, and another repair ship  were assigned to his command.  Panther was given responsibility for tending trawlers William Ashton, Thomas Blackhorne, Thomas Buckley, Richard Bulkeley, George Burton, Pat Caharty, William Caldwell, George Clarke, John Clay, George Cochrane, John Collins, William Darnold, Sam Duffy, John Dunkin, John Fitzgerald, John Graham, Thomas Graham, Thomas Henrix, William Johnson, Thomas Laundry, and submarine chasers SC-37, 38, 40, 44, 45, 46, 47, 48, 95, 110, 164, 178, 181, 182, 206, 207, 208, 254, 256, 259, 272, 329, 354 and 356.  Blackhawk provided tender services for the larger ships operating as six divisions.

 Buoying Division: , Patapsco, Patuxent, 

Common difficulties with the sweeping procedure involved mine cables becoming entangled in the kites attached to the sweeping wires.  Sweeping gear was often lost if the mine detonated and cut the sweeping cables.  Approximately one-third of the ships were damaged by exploding mines.  Two men were killed in separate incidents while attempting to haul mines aboard to clear fouled sweeping kites.  It had been assumed the Mk 6 mine hydrostatic safety devices would minimize the risks of this procedure, but sweeping gear losses increased after unreliability of these safety devices was recognized.  Countermining sequences initiated by destruction of a swept mine causing detonation of an undetected mine closer to one of the minesweepers were another source of damage.  Some of this countermining was attributed to acceleration of the antenna fuze relay armature or seawater leaking into damaged mines rather than sympathetic detonation of explosives.  The minesweepers were sometimes able to continue sweeping, but the trawlers were less durable.  Seven men drowned when the Richard Bulkeley was sunk by a mine detonation on 12 July.  Strauss discontinued use of the trawlers for minesweeping, but retained six for transporting replacement sweeping gear to minesweepers when wires were destroyed by exploding mines.  The remaining 13 trawlers were returned to the Admiralty.  Most damaged ships were repaired, but SC-38 was declared a total loss.  Three more men of the minesweeping force were killed in individual accidents involving sweeping gear before Strauss declared the barrage cleared on 30 September 1919. The minesweepers found only about 25 to 30 percent of the mines laid a year earlier; but it was assumed the others had either broken free, sunk to the bottom, or been destroyed by premature explosions.  Strauss was recognized as a Knight Commander of St Michael and St George for his efforts; but doubts about effectiveness of the minesweeping effort persisted into the 21st century.

Post-war consequences
As 1919 drew to a close, the onset of winter forced the suspension of sweeping for moored buoyant mines, but the Royal Navy resumed minesweeping operations the following spring, continuing to clear sunken mines from fishing grounds, and maintaining a destroyer patrol to track down mines that had broken free of their moorings and gone adrift. Losses of civilian ships to North Sea mines continued; the origin of the mine in these cases was often difficult to determine.  In 1919, twenty crewmen drowned when the Swedish steamship Hollander sank, minutes after striking a mine in October; and the steamer Kerwood struck a mine and sank on 1 December.

See also
 Otranto Barrage

Notes

Bibliography
 

Conflicts in 1918
North Sea operations of World War I
Naval mines